Hilma af Klint (26 October 1862 – 21 October 1944) was a Swedish artist and mystic whose paintings are considered among the first abstract works known in Western art history. A considerable body of her work predates the first purely abstract compositions by Kandinsky, Malevich and Mondrian. She belonged to a group called "The Five", comprising a circle of women inspired by Theosophy, who shared a belief in the importance of trying to contact the so-called "High Masters"—often by way of séances. Her paintings, which sometimes resemble diagrams, were a visual representation of complex spiritual ideas.

Early life 

Hilma af Klint was the fourth child of Mathilda af Klint (née Sonntag) and Captain Victor af Klint, a Swedish naval commander, and she spent summers with her family at their manor, "Hanmora", on the island of Adelsö in Lake Mälaren. In these idyllic surroundings she came into contact with nature at an early stage in her life, and a deep association with natural forms was to be an inspiration in her work. Later in life, Hilma af Klint lived permanently on Munsö, an island next to Adelsö.

From her family, Hilma af Klint inherited a great interest for mathematics and botany. She showed an early ability in visual art and, after the family moved to Stockholm, she studied at Tekniska skolan in Stockholm (Konstfack today), where she learned portraiture and landscape painting.

She was admitted at the Royal Academy of Fine Arts at the age of twenty. During the years 1882–1887 she studied mainly drawing, portrait painting, and landscape painting. She graduated with honors and was allocated a scholarship in the form of a studio in the so-called "Atelier Building" (Ateljébyggnaden), owned by The Academy of Fine Arts between Hamngatan and Kungsträdgården in central Stockholm. This was the main cultural hub in the Swedish capital at that time. The same building also held Blanch's Café and Blanch's Art Gallery, where conflict existed between the conventional art view of the Academy of Fine Arts and the opposition movement of the Art Society (Konstnärsförbundet), inspired by the French En Plein Air painters. Hilma af Klint began working in Stockholm, gaining recognition for her landscapes, botanical drawings, and portraits.

Her conventional painting became the source of financial income, but her 'life's work' remained a quite separate practice.

Spiritual and philosophical ideas 

In 1880 her younger sister Hermina died, and it was at this time that the spiritual dimension of her life began to develop. Her interest in abstraction and symbolism came from Hilma af Klint's involvement in spiritism, very much in vogue at the end of the nineteenth and beginning of the twentieth century. Her experiments in spiritual investigation started in 1879. She became interested in the Theosophy of Madame Blavatsky and the philosophy of Christian Rosencreutz. In 1908 she met Rudolf Steiner, the founder of the Anthroposophical Society, who was visiting Stockholm. Steiner introduced her to his own theories regarding the Arts, and would have some influence on her paintings later in life. Several years later, in 1920, she met him again at the Goetheanum in Dornach, Switzerland, the headquarters of the Anthroposophical Society. Between 1921 and 1930 she spent long periods at the Goetheanum.

Af Klint's work can be understood in the wider context of the Modernist search for new forms in artistic, spiritual, political, and scientific systems at the beginning of the twentieth century. There was a similar interest in spirituality by other artists during this same period, including Wassily Kandinsky, Piet Mondrian, Kasimir Malevitch, and the French Nabis, in which many, like af Klint, were inspired by the Theosophical Movement.

The works of Hilma af Klint are mainly spiritual, and her artistic work is a consequence of this.

She felt the abstract work and the meaning within were so groundbreaking that the world was not ready to see it, and she wished for the work to remain unseen for 20 years after her death.

Work 

At the Academy of Fine Arts she met Anna Cassel, the first of the four women with whom she later worked in "The Five" (De Fem), a group of artists who shared her ideas. The other members were Cornelia Cederberg, Sigrid Hedman, and Mathilda Nilsson. ''The Five'' began their association as members of the Edelweiss Society, which embraced a combination of the Theosophical teachings of Helena Blavatsky and spiritualism. All of The Five were interested in the paranormal and regularly organized spiritistic séances. They opened each meeting with a prayer, followed by a meditation, a Christian sermon, and a review and analysis of a text from the New Testament. This would be followed by a séance. They recorded in a book a completely new system of mystical thought, in the form of messages from higher spirits called The High Masters ("Höga Mästare"). One, Gregor, announced, "All the knowledge that is not of the senses, not of the intellect, not of the heart but is the property that exclusively belongs to the deepest aspect of your being...the knowledge of your spirit".

Through her work with The Five, Hilma af Klint created experimental automatic drawing as early as 1896, leading her toward an inventive geometric visual language capable of conceptualizing invisible forces both of the inner and outer worlds.
She explored world religions, atoms, and the plant world and wrote extensively about her discoveries. As she became more familiar with this form of expression, Hilma af Klint was assigned by the High Masters to create the paintings for the "Temple" – however she never understood what this "Temple" referred to.

Hilma af Klint felt she was being directed by a force that would literally guide her hand. She wrote in her notebook:

The pictures were painted directly through me, without any preliminary drawings, and with great force. I had no idea what the paintings were supposed to depict; nevertheless I worked swiftly and surely, without changing a single brush stroke.

In 1906, after 20 years of artistic works, and at the age of 44, Hilma af Klint painted her first series of abstract paintings.

The works for the Temple were created between 1906 and 1915, carried out in two phases with an interruption between 1908 and 1912. As Hilma af Klint discovered her new form of visual expression, she developed a new artistic language. Her painting became more autonomous and more intentional. The spiritual would continue to be the main source of creativity throughout the rest of her life.

The collection for the Temple is 193 paintings, grouped within several sub-series. The major paintings, dated 1907, are extremely large: each painting measures approximately 240 x 320 cm. This series, called The Ten Largest, describes the different phases of life, from early childhood to old age.

Quite apart from their diagrammatic purpose the paintings have a freshness and a modern aesthetic of tentative line and hastily captured image: a segmented circle, a helix bisected and divided into a spectrum of lightly painted colours. The artistic world of Hilma af Klint is impregnated with symbols, letters, and words. The paintings often depict symmetrical dualities, or reciprocities: up and down, in and out, earthly and esoteric, male and female, good and evil. The colour choice throughout is metaphorical: blue stands for the female spirit, yellow for the male one, and pink / red for physical / spiritual love. The Swan and the Dove, names of two series of the Paintings for the Temple, are also symbolic, representing respectively transcendence and love. Understood as gates to other dimensions, her paintings call for interpretation on a narrative, esoteric and artistic level while evoking primordial geometry and humanistic motifs.

When Hilma af Klint had completed the works for the Temple, the spiritual guidance ended. However, she continued to pursue abstract painting, now independent from any external influence. The paintings for the Temple were mostly oil paintings, but she now also used watercolours. Her later paintings are significantly smaller in size. She painted among others a series depicting the stand-points of different religions at various stages in history, as well as representations of the duality between the physical being and its equivalence on an esoteric level. As Hilma af Klint pursued her artistic and esoteric research, it is possible to perceive a certain inspiration from the artistic theories developed by the Anthroposophical Society from 1920 onward.

Through her life, Hilma af Klint would seek to understand the mysteries that she had come in contact with through her work. She produced more than 150 notebooks with her thoughts and studies.

In 1908 af Klint met Rudolf Steiner for the first time. In one of the few remaining letters, she was asking Steiner to visit her in Stockholm and see the finished part of the Paintings for the Temple series, 111 paintings in total. Steiner did see the paintings but mostly left unimpressed, stating that her way of working was inappropriate for a theosophist. According to H.P. Blavatsky, mediumship was a faulty practice, leading its adepts on the wrong path of occultism and black magic. However, during their meeting, Steiner stated that af Klint's contemporaries would not be able to accept and understand their paintings, and it would take another 50 years to decipher them. Of all the paintings shown to him, Steiner paid special attention only to the Primordial Chaos Group, noting them as "the best symbolically". After meeting Steiner, af Klint was devastated by his response and, apparently, stopped painting for 4 years. Interestingly enough, Steiner kept photographs of some of af Klint's artworks, some of them even hand-coloured. Later the same year he met Wassily Kandinsky, who had not yet come to abstract painting. Some art historians assume that Kandinsky could have seen the photographs and perhaps was influenced by them while developing his own abstract path. Later in her life, she made a decision to destroy all her correspondence. She left a collection of more than 1200 paintings and 125 diaries to her nephew, Erik af Klint. Among her last paintings made in 1930s, there are two watercolours predicting the events of World War II, titled The Blitz and The Fight in the Mediterranean.

Despite the popular belief that Hilma af Klint had chosen to never exhibit her abstract works during her lifetime, in recent years art historians such as Julia Voss uncovered enough evidence of af Klint making an actual effort to show her art to the public. Around 1920 in Dornach, Switzerland, af Klint met Dutch eurythmist Peggy Kloppers-Moltzer, who was also a member of The Anthroposophical Society. Later, the artist travelled to Amsterdam, where she and Kloppers discussed the possible exhibition with the editors of art and architecture magazine Wendingen.
Although the Amsterdam talks did not bring any result, at least one exhibition of Hilma af Klint's abstract works actually happened in London several years later. In July 1928 in London, the World Conference on Spiritual Science took place, with Kloppers being one of the organizing committee members. Originally, Hilma af Klint was excluded from the circle of participants, but after Kloppers' insistence, the matter was settled. In July 1928 Hilma af Klint takes a boat trip from Stockholm to London, along with some of her large-scale paintings. In her postcard to Anna Cassel (discovered only in 2018) af Klint writes that she was not alone during this 4-day trip. Despite af Klint not stating the name, Julia Voss suggests that most likely her companion was Thomasine Andersson, an old friend from De Fem days. Voss also stated that despite the list of paintings presented being unknown, we can suggest that these were some extracts from the Paintings for the Temple series.

Hilma af Klint died in Djursholm, Sweden in 1944, nearly 82 years old, in the aftermath of a traffic accident, having only exhibited her works a handful of times, mainly at spiritual conferences and gatherings. She is buried at Galärvarvskyrkogården in Stockholm.

Signature style 
Hilma Af Klint's later period abstract art (1906-1920) delved into symbolism with a combination of geometry, figuration, scientific research and religious practices. Her studies of organic growth, including shells and flowers, helped her portray life through a spiritual lens.

Her individual or signature style was also marked with impressions from the late 19th and early 20th century scientific discoveries as also influenced by contemporary spiritual movements such as theosophy and anthroposophy too. The idea to transcend the physical world and the constraints of representational art is visible in her abstract paintings. 

Her symbolic visual language has an ordered progression that reflects her understanding of grids, circles, spirals and petal-like forms—sometimes diagrammatic, sometimes biomorphic. Her paintings also explored dichotomy of the world.

Spiral forms appear often in her art, as they do in the automatic drawings by De Fem. While every such geometric form, in this case, Spiral suggests growth, progress and evolution, color choices also are metaphorical in nature.

As one of the Proto-Feminist Artists, her style represents the sublime in the art.

Legacy 
In her will, Hilma af Klint left all her abstract paintings to her nephew, vice-admiral Erik af Klint of the Royal Swedish Navy. She specified that her work should be kept secret for at least 20 years after her death. When the boxes were opened at the end of the 1960s, very few persons had knowledge of what would be revealed.

In 1970 her paintings were offered as a gift to Moderna Museet i Stockholm, but the donation was declined. Erik af Klint then donated thousands of drawings and paintings to a foundation bearing the artist's name in the 1970s. Thanks to the art historian Åke Fant, her art was introduced to an international audience in the 1980s, when he presented her at a Nordik conference in Helsinki in 1984.

The collection of abstract paintings of Hilma af Klint includes more than 1200 pieces. It is owned and managed by the Hilma af Klint Foundation in Stockholm, Sweden. In 2017, Norwegian architectural firm Snøhetta presented plans for an exhibition centre dedicated to af Klint in Järna, south of Stockholm, with estimated building costs of €6 to 7.5 million. In February 2018, the Foundation signed a long-term agreement of cooperation with the Moderna Museet, thereby confirming the perennity of the Hilma af Klint Room, i.e., a dedicated space at the museum where a dozen works of the artist are shown on a continuous basis.

Cultural references
 Hilma af Klint and her work are presented in the movie Personal Shopper, in which the main character, played by Kristen Stewart, researches art that is inspired by spirits.
 The work of Hilma af Klint is cited by Jane Weaver as inspiration for Modern Kosmology.
 Af Klint was the subject of a 2019 feature-length documentary by German director , titled Beyond the Visible — Hilma af Klint.
 Af Klint's work is presented in the 2020 short film Point and Line to Plane, written and directed by Sofia Bohdanowicz. The short features the Solomon R. Guggenheim Museum's 2018 exhibition Hilma Af Klint: Paintings for the Future, which is seen in mid-installation.

Exhibitions (posthumous)
The abstract work of Hilma af Klint was shown for the first time at the exhibition "The Spiritual in Art, Abstract Painting 1890–1985" organized by Maurice Tuchman in Los Angeles in 1986. This exhibition was the starting point of her international recognition.

“Hilma Af Klint: Paintings for the Future” the Solomon R. Guggenheim Museum’s exhibition was the most-visited exhibition in the museum’s 60-year history. The show was attended by over 600,000 visitors.

Selected exhibitions
 The Spiritual in Art: Abstract Painting 1890–1985, Los Angeles County Museum of Art, Los Angeles, USA. 23 November 1986 – 8 March 1987. Travelling exhibition : Museum of Contemporary Art, Chicago, USA. 17 April – 19 July 1987; Gemeentemuseum Den Haag, Netherlands. 1 September – 22 November 1987
 Hilma af Klints hemliga bilder, Nordic Art Association, Sveaborg Helsinki, Finland 1988–1989
 The Secret Pictures by Hilma af Klint, MoMA PS1, Queens, New York. 15 January – 12 March 1989
 Ockult målarinna och abstrakt pionjär, Moderna Museet i Stockholm, Sweden 1989–1991. Travelling exhibition : Göteborgs Konsthall, Gothenburg, Sweden; Lunds Konsthall, Lund, Sweden; Fyns Kunstmuseum, Denmark.
 Okkultismus und Abstraktion, Die Malerin Hilma af Klint, Albertina, Vienna, Austria 1991–1992. Travelling exhibition : Kunsthaus Graz, Austria; Modern Museum of Passau, Germany
 Målningarna till templet (The paintings to the Temple), Liljevalchs konsthall, Stockholm, Sweden 1999–2000
 3 x Abstraction: New Methods of Drawing, The Drawing Center, New York, USA 2005–2006; Santa Monica Museum of Art, USA; Irish Museum of Modern Art, Dublin, Ireland 2005–2006
 An Atom in the Universe, Camden Arts Centre, UK 2006
 The Alpine Cathedral and The City-Crown, Josiah McElheny. Moderna Museet i Stockholm, Sweden. 1 December 2007 – 31 March 2008 (represented by 14 paintings)
 The Message. The Medium as artist – Das Medium als Künstler Museum in Bochum, Germany. 16 February – 13 April 2008 (represented by 4 paintings)
 Traces du Sacré Centre Pompidou, Paris, France. 7 May – 11 August 2008. (represented by 7 paintings)
 Hilma af Klint – Une modernité rélévée Centre Culturel Suédois, Paris, France. April – August 2008 (represented by 59 paintings)
 Traces du Sacré Haus der Kunst, Munich, Germany. 18 September 2008 – 11 January 2009
 De geheime schilderijen van Hilma af Klint, Museum voor Moderne Kunst, Arnhem, Netherlands. 7 March 2010 – 30 May 2010
  Beyond Colour, See! Colour! – Four exhibitions at the Cultural Center in Järna, South of Stockholm, Sweden. James Turrell, Rudolf Steiner, 14 May – Oktober 2, 2011
 Hilma af Klint – a Pioneer of Abstraction was produced by and showed at Moderna Museet i Stockholm, Sweden, from 16 February until 26 May 2013, before touring to Hamburger Bahnhof – Museum für Gegenwart in Berlin, Germany, from 15 June to 6 October; Museo Picasso Málaga, Spain, from 21 October 2013 to 9 February 2014; Louisiana Museum of Modern Art, Humblebaek, Copenhaguen, Denmark 2014; Henie Onstad Kunstsenter, Oslo, Norway 2015; Kumu, Tallinn, Estonia 2015
 Works by af Klint was exhibited at the Central Pavilion of the 55th Venice Biennale, Italy. 1 June – 24 November 2013.
 Cosa mentale – Imaginaries of Telepathy of the 20th-Century Art, Centre Pompidou, Metz, France. 28 October 2015 – 28 March 2016 (9 paintings)
 Painting the Unseen, Serpentine Galleries, London, UK. 3 March – 15 May 2016
 The Keeper, New Museum of Contemporary Art, New York, USA 20 July – 2 October 2016
 Beyond Stars – The Mystical Landscape from Monet to Kandinsky, Musée d'Orsay, Paris, France. 14 March – 25 June 2017 (1 painting)
 Jardin infini. De Giverny à l'Amazonie, Centre Pompidou, Metz, France. 18 March – 28 August 2017 (7 paintings)
 L'emozione dei COLORI nell'arte, Galleria civica d'arte moderna e contemporanea GAM of Turin, Italy. 14 March – 23 July 2017
 As Above, So Below, Irish Museum of Modern Art, Dublin, Ireland. 13 April – 27 August 2017
 Intuition, Palazzo Fortuny in Venice, Italy. 13 May – 26 November 2017
 Göteborg International Biennial for Contemporary Art (GIBCA), Göteborgs Konsthall in Gothenburg, Sweden. 9 September – 19 November 2017
 Hilma af Klint, Pinacoteca do Estado de São Paulo in São Paulo, Brazil. 3 March – 16 July 2018
 Hilma af Klint: Paintings for the Future, Solomon R. Guggenheim Museum in New York, USA. 12 October 2018 – 23 April 2019
 Hilma af Klint: The Secret Paintings, Art Gallery of New South Wales, 12 June – 19 September 2021
 Hilma af Klint: The Secret Paintings, City Gallery Wellington, 4 December 2021 –  27 March 2022

Gallery

See also 
 Hilma af Klint and Theosophy

Publications
 HILMA AF KLINT: Catalogue Raisonné, Bokförlaget Stolpe,Vol. I - VII, December 27, 2022, 
 The Spiritual in Art, Abstract Painting 1890-1985, publ. Los Angeles County Museum of Art, 1986.  LACMA : pbk
  Hilma af Klint, Raster Förlag, Stockholm. Swedish text, about 100 pictures. 
  Vägen till templet, Rosengårdens Förlag. Swedish text, 30 sketches. Describes the teaching period to become a medium. 
  Enheten bortom mångfalden, Rosengårdens Förlag. Swedish text, 32 pictures. Two parts, one philosophical and one art-scientific.  
 I describe the way and meanwhile I am proceeding along it, Rosengårdens Förlag. A short introduction in English with 3 pictures. 
 3 X Abstraction, Catherine de Zegher and Hendel Teicher (eds.), Yale University Press and The Drawing Center, New York, 2005 
  Okkultismus und Abstraktion, die Malerin Hilma af Klint, Åke Fant, Albertina, Wien 1992, .
  Mod Lyset – Belyj, Goethe, Hilma af Klint, Jeichau, Kandinsky, Martinus, Rosenkrantz, Steiner Gl. Holtegaard & Nordjyllands Kunstmuseum. 2004. 
 Hilma af Klint, the Greatness of Things, John Hutchinson (ed.), Douglas Hyde Gallery, Dublin 2005. English text, 23 images. .
 The Message. Art and Occultism. With an Essay by André Breton. Hrsg. v. Claudia Dichter, Hans Günter Golinski, Michael Krajewski, Susanne Zander. Kunstmuseum Bochum. Walther König: Köln 2007, .
 Swedish Women Artists: Sigrid Hjertén, Hilma af Klint, Nathalie Djurberg, Signe Hammarsten-Jansson, Aleksandra Mir, Ulrika Pasch, Books LCC, 2010. 
 The Legacy of Hilma af Klint: Nine Contemporary Responses (English / German), Ann-Sofi Norin, Daniel Birnbaum, Verlag der Buchhandlung Walther König, 2013. 
 Hilma af Klint. The Art of Seeing the Invisible, by Kurt Belfrage, Louise Almqvist (eds.), 2015 
 Hilma af Klint – A Pioneer of Abstraction, edited by Iris Müller-Westermann with Jo Widoff, with contributions by David Lomas, Pascal Rousseau and Helmut Zander, exhibition catalogue of Moderna Museet nr. 375, 2013.  
 Hilma af Klint – Painting the Unseen, edited by Daniel Birnbaum and Emma Enderby, with contributions by Julia Peyton-Jones, Hans Ulrich Obrist, Jennifer Higgie and Julia Voss. Serpentine Galleries / Koenig Books, 2016.  
  Hilma – en roman om gåtan Hilma af Klint [Hilma – a novel about the enigma Hilma af Klint], Anna Laestadius Larsson, ed. Piratförlaget, 24 May 2017 
 Hilma af Klint – Seeing is Believing, Kurt Almqvist and Louise Belfrage, König Books, 7 October 2017 
  Ni vues, Ni connues pp. 42–44, Collectif Georgette Sand, Publisher Hugo Doc collection Les Simone, 5 October 2017 
 Hilma af Klint: Notes and Methods, with an introduction and commentary by Iris Müller-Westerman, University of Chicago Press, 2018

References

External links 

 
 
 
 
 
 
 Hilma af Klint Foundation
  (in Swedish with English subtitles, 22 minutes)
 

1862 births
1944 deaths
People from Solna Municipality
19th-century Swedish painters
19th-century Christian mystics
20th-century Swedish painters
20th-century Christian mystics
Christian occultists
Abstract painters
Swedish nobility
Swedish Theosophists
Anthroposophists
Modern artists
Drawing mediums
Swedish women painters
Swedish painters
20th-century Swedish women artists
20th-century Swedish artists
19th-century Swedish women artists
19th-century Swedish artists
Road incident deaths in Sweden
Burials at Galärvarvskyrkogården